The Last Round is a 1976 Italian crime film directed by Stelvio Massi.

Cast

Carlos Monzón: Marco Russo
Luc Merenda: Rico Manzetti
Leonora Fani: Nina
Mariangela Giordano:  Lisa's Mother
Gianni Dei: Beny Manzetti
Giampiero Albertini: Sapienza
Susana Giménez: Maristella
Luisa Maneri (credited as Annaluisa Pesce): Lisa 
Mario Brega: Bobo Belmondo
Nello Pazzafini: Henchman of Rico

See also    
 List of Italian films of 1976

References

External links

1976 films
1970s Italian-language films
Films directed by Stelvio Massi
Italian crime films
1976 crime films
Films scored by Luis Bacalov
1970s Italian films